The 2017 World RX of Belgium was the fourth round of the fourth season of the FIA World Rallycross Championship. The event was held at the Circuit Jules Tacheny Mettet in Mettet, Wallonia and also played host to the third round of the 2017 FIA European Rallycross Championship. It also hosted the first round of the 2017 RX2 International Series, the support category of the World Rallycross Championship.

Supercar

Heats

Semi-finals
Semi-Final 1

Semi-Final 2

Final

RX2 International Series

Heats

Semi-finals
Semi-Final 1

Semi-Final 2

Final

Standings after the event

Supercar standings

RX2 standings

 Note: Only the top five positions are included.

References

External links

|- style="text-align:center"
|width="35%"|Previous race:2017 World RX of Hockenheim
|width="40%"|FIA World Rallycross Championship2017 season
|width="35%"|Next race:2017 World RX of Great Britain
|- style="text-align:center"
|width="35%"|Previous race:2016 World RX of Belgium
|width="40%"|World RX of Belgium
|width="35%"|Next race:2018 World RX of Belgium
|- style="text-align:center"

Belgium
World RX
World RX